Yesterday's Echo is a crime novel written by Matt Coyle and published by Oceanview Publishing on 7 May 2013. The novel won the Anthony Award for Best First Novel in 2014.

Plot

Reception 
Publishers Weekly called Yesterday's Echo a "promising debut," saying, "Coyle breaks no new ground, but Cahill turns out to be both tough and resourceful when forced to confront his past. Readers can hope his future will be brighter."

References 

2013 American novels
American mystery novels
Anthony Award-winning works